Elachista bifasciella is a moth of the family Elachistidae. It is found from Sweden to the Pyrenees, Italy and Romania and from the Netherlands to Poland. It is the type species of the genus Elachista.

Adults are on wing in May and June.

The larvae feed on Agrostis gigantea, Agrostis stolonifera, Brachypodium sylvaticum, Calamagrostis arundinacea, Calamagrostis varia, Calamagrostis villosa, Corynephorus canescens, Dactylis glomerata, Deschampsia cespitosa, Deschampsia flexuosa, Festuca gigantea, Festuca ovina, Festuca rubra, Holcus mollis, Milium effusum and Poa nemoralis. They mine the leaves of their host plant. The mine descends from just below the leaf tip to the center of the leaf. The frass is deposited in a continuous, sometimes double line. A single larva makes several mines. Pupation takes place outside of the mine. Larvae can be found in spring. They are dull grey green with a pale brown head.

References

bifasciella
Moths described in 1833
Moths of Europe